Moreau River may refer to:

Moreau River (Missouri)
Moreau River (South Dakota)